Raúl Rogelio Chavarría Salas (born 11 August 1956) is a Mexican politician affiliated with the National Action Party. As of 2014 he served as Deputy of the LIX Legislature of the Mexican Congress representing Querétaro.

References

1956 births
Living people
Politicians from Querétaro
National Action Party (Mexico) politicians
National Autonomous University of Mexico alumni
Members of the Congress of Querétaro
Deputies of the LIX Legislature of Mexico
Members of the Chamber of Deputies (Mexico) for Querétaro